The Frank M. Scarlett Federal Building is a federal building of the United States located at 805 Gloucester Street in Brunswick, Georgia. Completed in 1959, it houses both a United States Post Office and operations of the United States District Court for the Southern District of Georgia. In December 1973, Senator Herman Talmadge introduced a bill in the United States Congress to rename the facility for segregationist district court judge Francis Muir Scarlett; this bill was passed into law on January 2, 1975. The building was added to the National Register of Historic Places in 2014. The east side of the building was remodeled in 2015-16.

References

External links
 
Historic Federal Courthouses page from the Federal Judicial Center
Georgia Federal Buildings from the General Services Administration

Federal courthouses in the United States
Courthouses in Georgia (U.S. state)
Brunswick, Georgia
Government buildings completed in 1959
Buildings and structures in Glynn County, Georgia
1959 establishments in Georgia (U.S. state)